Comité International des Sports des Sourds (CISS) is the apex body organizing international sports events for the deaf, particularly the Deaflympics (previously called World Games for the Deaf).  It is also called the International Committee of Sports for the Deaf. The organization was founded in Paris by Eugène Rubens-Alcais, who organized the first "International Silent Games" in 1924.  Alcais was himself deaf and was the president of the French Deaf Sports Federation.

CISS, now also called ICSD, is headquartered in Lausanne, Switzerland.

History

The early pioneers of the international deaf sports movement were Eugène Rubens-Alcais (France) and Antoine Dresse (Belgium).

The first Summer Games were held in Paris in 1924, it started with 148 athletes from 9 countries (France, Belgium, Great Britain, Holland, Hungary, Italy, Poland, Romania and Czechoslovakia). And the first Winter Games were instituted in 1949 at Seefeld, Austria, it attracted 33 athletes from 5 countries.

In 1935, Japan joins CISS as the first Asian member and the United States as first North American member. Australia and New Zealand joined later in 1955 as first Oceania members. The first African member were South Africa, in 1975.

Events

Deaflympics

The Deaflympics (previously called World Games for the Deaf, and International Games for the Deaf) are an International Olympic Committee (IOC)-sanctioned event at which deaf athletes compete at an elite level.

Presidents
 1924-1953:  Eugène Rubens-Alcais
 1953-1955:  Oscar Ryden
 1955-1961:  Jens Peter Nielsen
 1961-1971:  Pierre Bernhard
 1971-1995:  Jerald M. Jordan
 1995-2003:  John M. Lovett
 2003-2009:  Donalda Ammons Kay
 2009-2013:  Craig A. Crowley
 2013-2018:  Valery Nikititch Rukhledev
 2019-2020:  Chinese Taipei Kang Chen
 2021-2022:  Gustavo de Araújo Perazzolo
 2022-present:  Ádám Kósa

See also
 International Olympic Committee
 International Paralympic Committee
 Special Olympics

References

External links
 International Committee of Sports for the Deaf
 Welcome!
 CISS.org | ICSD

International sports organizations
Organizations based in Maryland
Deaflympics
Deaf sports organizations